The Walls Came Tumbling Down may refer to:

 The Walls Came Tumbling Down (film), a 1946 American film directed by Lothar Mendes
 The Walls Came Tumbling Down (Wilson book), a 1997 film script by Robert Anton Wilson
The Walls Came Tumbling Down: The Collapse of Communism in Eastern Europe, a book by Gale Stokes
 The Walls Came Tumbling (novel), a 1957 novel by Henriette Roosenburg
 The Walls Came Tumbling Down, a 1943 novel by Jo Eisinger

See also
And the Walls Came Tumbling Down, 1989 autobiography by American civil rights leader Ralph David Abernathy
 "Joshua Fit the Battle of Jericho", an African-American spiritual featuring the lyrics "the walls came tumbling down"
 Tumbling Down (disambiguation)